Sarah Emily York (1819 – 1851) was an American missionary to Greece.

Biography
Sarah Emily York was born in 1819 in Charlestown, Massachusetts.  After completing her schooling at the female seminary in Charlestown, Massachusetts, she became a teacher in Boston. She taught both in a private school and in a Baptist Sunday school.

With the support of Baptist Board of Foreign Missions, she arrived to Greece as a missionary in 1844.

She started the works at the missionary fields of the Greek islands of Corfu and Zakynthos as well as in the city of Piraeus.  She worked in a school at Corfu. In 1848, she married John York, a native of Corfu.

She died in Charlestown in 1819 following “fever”.

References

1819 births
1851 deaths
American missionaries